Bucculatrix zophopasta is a moth in the family Bucculatricidae. It was described by Annette Frances Braun in 1963 and is found in North America, where it has been recorded from British Columbia, Oregon and California.

Adults have been recorded on wing in March, June and August.

The larvae feed on Quercus garryana and possibly Quercus lobata.

References

Natural History Museum Lepidoptera generic names catalog

Bucculatricidae
Moths described in 1963
Moths of North America
Taxa named by Annette Frances Braun